Platinum High School is a 1960 American crime drama romance film directed by Charles Haas and starring Mickey Rooney, Terry Moore and Dan Duryea. It was based on the 1960 novel of the same name by Irving Shulman.

Plot
Sailing to a coastal California island, Steven Conway sets out to find out what caused the mysterious death of his son. Denied food and lodging at his first two stops, Conway goes to a remote and elite military school on Sabre Island. The school is run by  Major Redfern Kelly, whose secretary Jennifer Evans wonders why it took Conway four months to come inquire about his son.

Conway explains that he had been in Pakistan the past few months on a business project and only recently found out that the boy's mother, now deceased, had sent him to this exclusive academy with the $10,000 tuition. He asks to see his son's records and to speak to a student, Crip Hastings, who might have witnessed the boy's death.

Jennifer is having an affair with the married Kelly and warns the major not to let Conway speak to the Hastings boy. Three cadets begin to harass Conway, attempting to provoke him into a fight. They taunt Crip as well, warning him to say nothing.

Conway learns that his son was accidentally killed by the cadets in a brutal initiation rite. On the boat home, Jennifer pretends to help, but has arranged an ambush. It backfires as she falls into shark-infested waters while Conway sets the boat ablaze with Kelly aboard. He makes his way back to shore safely when Joe Nibley shoots at the sharks in the water.

Cast
 Mickey Rooney as Steven Conway
 Terry Moore as Jennifer Evens
 Dan Duryea as Maj. Redfern Kelly
 Conway Twitty as Billy Jack Barnes
 Warren Berlinger as 'Crip' Hastings
 Yvette Mimieux as Lorinda Nibley
 Jimmy Boyd as Bud Starkweather
 Richard Jaeckel as Hack Marlow
 Elisha Cook Jr. as Harry Nesbit
 Jack Carr as Joe Nibley
 Christopher Dark as Vince Perley 
 Harold Lloyd Jr. as Charlie-Boy Cable

Production
The film was the last made in a six-film deal between producer Albert Zugsmith and MGM.

Reception
According to MGM records the film earned $175,000 in the US and Canada and $150,000 elsewhere, making a loss to the studio of $270,000.

See also
 List of American films of 1960

References

External links

1960 films
1960 crime drama films
American black-and-white films
American crime drama films
Films directed by Charles F. Haas
Films set in schools
Metro-Goldwyn-Mayer films
1960s English-language films
1960s American films